Tony Knotts (born May 12, 1951) is an American Democratic politician who represented District 26 (Prince George's County) in the Maryland House of Delegates from 2015 to 2019. He also represented District 8 in the Prince George's County council from 2002 to 2010, a seat he will be running for again in 2022 following the resignation of Monique Anderson-Walker.

Electoral history

References

Democratic Party members of the Maryland House of Delegates
Living people
Place of birth missing (living people)
1951 births